The Graham Fire was a wildfire four miles south of the Metolius River near Culver, Oregon. The fire was caused by a lightning strike and was first reported on June 21, 2018. The fire is one of 70 started over a two-day period of dry conditions and heavy winds in Central Oregon. The fire was contained on June .

Events

The Graham Fire was reported on the afternoon of June 21, 2018 south of the Metolius River near Culver, Oregon. The fire was started by a lightning strike and was fueled by brush, timber and grass, primarily burning private lands. By Saturday, June 23, the fire had reached , with fire crews focusing on burnout efforts to contain the fire. Two homes and five out buildings were destroyed.

Impact

The Graham Fire burned private lands protected by the Oregon Department of Forestry and Lake Chinook Fire and Rescue, as well as public lands owned by the Bureau of Land Management. In total, two homes and five outbuildings were destroyed.

Evacuations

The subdivision of Three Rivers was evacuated on June 21 due to extreme fire conditions threatening homes.

References

June 2018 events in the United States
Jefferson County, Oregon
2018 Oregon wildfires